Striberg is a locality situated in Nora Municipality, Örebro County, Sweden with 317 inhabitants in 2010.  It is the birthplace of composer Dag Wirén.

References 

Populated places in Örebro County
Populated places in Nora Municipality